Christopher Charles Stephens (born 20 March 1973) is a Scottish National Party (SNP) politician. He has been the Member of Parliament (MP) for Glasgow South West since the 2015 general election. He has been serving as SNP Spokesperson for Levelling Up since December 2022.

Early life and career
Stephens was born in Glasgow and was educated at Trinity High School, Renfrew and James Watt College in Greenock, where he studied public administration. He joined the SNP at the age of sixteen.

He completed an apprenticeship at Strathclyde Regional Council before working at the council. Stephens then worked for the Glasgow City Council. During this time, he joined the trade union UNISON. Initially Stephens was their youth officer in Glasgow and was later promoted in that branch to treasurer and then vice-chair.

Political career
He first stood for the UK Parliament at the 2001 General Election, contesting the Hamilton North and Bellshill constituency. He contested the Glasgow Pollok constituency at the 2007 and 2011 Scottish Parliament elections. In 2011 he came within 623 votes of taking the seat from Johann Lamont.

Stephens was 6th on the list of SNP candidates for the six Scottish seats in the 2014 European Parliament election, although as only the first two SNP candidates were elected, Stephens was not elected.

He was elected to the UK Parliament in 2015, winning the contest for the Glasgow South West constituency with a majority of 10,000. Before the election, Stephens was the secretary of the SNP Trade Union Group, a member of the party's National Executive Committee, and the convener of the SNP's Glasgow Pollok Constituency Association. In 2017, he retained his seat by a margin of just 60 votes.

Stephens is a vice-chair of the All-Party Parliamentary Group on South Africa and Chair of the Public and Commercial Services Union Parliamentary Group.

In October 2016, Stephens was reported to have signed the highest number of Early Day Motions of any Member of Parliament.

In March 2018, it was reported that he attempted to make two members of staff in his constituency office redundant, subsequently suspending them from employment, generating criticism from members of his own party.

Personal life
Stephens is married to Aileen Colleran, a former Labour councillor elected to Glasgow City Council until 2017. He employed his wife as a part-time parliamentary assistant from August 2017 to 30 April 2018.

References

External links

 Profile on SNP website

1973 births
Living people
Members of the Parliament of the United Kingdom for Glasgow constituencies
Scottish National Party MPs
Scottish trade unionists
UK MPs 2015–2017
UK MPs 2017–2019
UK MPs 2019–present